Diaspro may refer to:

Alberto Diaspro, scientist
Diaspro (submarine), Italian coastal submarine of the Perla class
Diaspro, see List of Winx Club characters